Leonardo Germán Sigali (born 28 May 1987) is an Argentine footballer, who plays for Racing Club.

Club career 

Sigali came through the youth system at Nueva Chicago, club from the Western part of the Argentine capital, to make his professional debut in 2006. With Nueva Chicago Sigali formed part of the team that was champion of the Primera B Nacional (Argentine second division) 2006 Clausura, and ascended to the Argentine Primera. He played the 2006-07 season with Chicago in Primera as a central defender along Nicolás Sánchez. However, the club was relegated after losing the playoff to Tigre.

Subsequently, Sigali was bought by Spanish side Villarreal. However, he was immediately loaned to Lanús in 2007, as they needed more defensive cover due to injuries of other key players. He helped his new team to win the Apertura 2007 tournament, Lanús' first ever top flight league title.

In 2008, he joined newly promoted Godoy Cruz, on loan. The deal was made permanent in 2010, when Godoy Cruz bought 50% of Sigali's rights.

Sigali currently plays for Racing Club earning £9,000 per week.

International career 

In 2007, Sigali was part of the Argentine squad that won the 2007 U-20 World Cup.

Honours
Lanús
Primera División: 2007 Apertura

Dinamo Zagreb
Prva HNL: 2014–15, 2015–16
Croatian Cup: 2014–15, 2015–16

Racing Club
Primera División: 2018–19
Trofeo de Campeones: 2019

Argentina U20
FIFA U-20 World Cup: 2007

References

External links
 Argentine Primera statistics
 Official Team Player Profile

1987 births
Living people
Sportspeople from Buenos Aires Province
Argentine people of indigenous peoples descent
Argentine footballers
Argentina under-20 international footballers
Association football central defenders
Argentine Primera División players
Croatian Football League players
Nueva Chicago footballers
Club Atlético Lanús footballers
GNK Dinamo Zagreb players
Godoy Cruz Antonio Tomba footballers
Racing Club de Avellaneda footballers
Argentine expatriate footballers
Expatriate footballers in Croatia
Argentine expatriate sportspeople in Croatia